Alex Maxwell García Mendoza (born 2 June 1993) is a Cuban judoka.

He competed at the 2016 Summer Olympics in Rio de Janeiro, in the men's +100 kg. There, he was defeated in a bronze medal match by Or Sasson of Israel.

References

External links
 
 
 

1993 births
Living people
Cuban male judoka
Olympic judoka of Cuba
Judoka at the 2016 Summer Olympics
Judoka at the 2010 Summer Youth Olympics
Pan American Games medalists in judo
Judoka at the 2015 Pan American Games
Pan American Games bronze medalists for Cuba
Medalists at the 2015 Pan American Games
20th-century Cuban people
21st-century Cuban people